André Friedrich or Andreas Friederich (17 January 1798, in Ribeauvillé – 9 March 1877, in Strasbourg) was an Alsatian artist, sculptor and lithographer active in Germany and France.

Life 
He studied at the Kunstakademie in Dresden and in 1819 (aged 21) he entered the Berlin studio of Johann Gottfried Schadow. He moved to Paris in 1821, where he studied under François Joseph Bosio, and spent two years in Rome, where in 1824 he studied under Bertel Thorvaldsen. In 1826 he settled in Strasbourg.

Selected sculptures 

 Memorial to Henri de La Tour d’Auvergne, Sasbach
 Portrait of Bernhard Boll, Freiburg Minster
 Portrait of Werner I, Strasbourg Cathedral
 Monument to Erwin von Steinbach, Steinbach district, Baden-Baden
 Statue of Francis Drake, Offenburg
 Portrait of Martin von Dunin, Poznań Cathedral
 'Leopoldsdenkmal' monument, Achern, marking the geographical centre of Baden
 Figure of Christ, granite, Oberachern district cemetery (now part of the war memorial), Achern
 Portrait of the poet Gottlieb Konrad Pfeffel, Colmar
 Memorial to Johannes Hültz, designer of the north spire of Strasbourg Cathedral
 Memorial to Jacob Sturm von Sturmeck, founder of the Strasbourg Gymnasium

Bibliography 
 Allgemeines Künstlerlexikon. Band 45, 2005, S. 143–144.
 

1798 births
1877 deaths
19th-century German sculptors
19th-century French sculptors
German lithographers
French lithographers
19th-century lithographers
People from Ribeauvillé
German male sculptors
French male sculptors
19th-century French male artists